MADH may refer to:

 Arabian panegyric poetry (praise-poems)
 the enzyme Methylamine dehydrogenase
 any homolog of the Drosophila gene "Mothers against decapentaplegic", e.g. SMAD1
 a module file format for music on computers
 Madh Island near Mumbai, India
 ACP-SH:acetate ligase, an enzyme